The House of Lies is a 1916 American silent film drama directed by William Desmond Taylor and written by L. V. Jefferson. The film stars Edna Goodrich, Juan de la Cruz, Kathleen Kirkham, Lucille Ward, Harold Holland and Herbert Standing. The film was released on September 14, 1916, by Paramount Pictures.

Plot
Realizing that her husband's inherited money is worryingly dwindling, Mrs. Coleman plans to find wealthy husbands for her daughter Dorothy and stepdaughter Edna. The latter, however, refuses to trade her beauty for money and inflicts herself with acid.

The family then pushes Edna aside. Dorothy, on the other hand, together with her mother, tries to be married by a poet, the rich Marcus Auriel. Edna, who has always been in love with Marcus's works, is hired by him as a secretary, revealing her stepmother's plans. Marcus, despite the scars on Edna's face, asks her to marry him. The girl agrees and then reveals that the scars are fake, like the acid was fake. And what disfigured her was simply greasepaint.

Cast 
Edna Goodrich as Edna Coleman
Juan de la Cruz as Marcus Auriel
Kathleen Kirkham as Dorothy
Lucille Ward as Mrs. Coleman
Harold Holland as Winthrop Haynes
Herbert Standing as Dr. Barnes

Preservation
Though the Library of Congress's database shows no Holdings for the film(*now it does, LOC updated January 2017), an older print catalog has the film as incomplete in the Library of Congress's collection.

References

External links 
 
 
 alternate Morosco lobby poster

1916 films
1910s English-language films
Silent American drama films
1916 drama films
Paramount Pictures films
Films directed by William Desmond Taylor
American black-and-white films
American silent feature films
1910s American films